Kisoroszi is a village on Szentendre Island in Pest county, Budapest metropolitan area, Hungary. It has a population of 892 (2007).

References

Populated places in Pest County